Si-cology 1: Tales and Wisdom from Duck Dynasty's Favorite Uncle is an autobiography by American television personality Silas Robertson, co-written by Mark Schlabach.

Summary

In this book Si talks about his life. He talks about what life was like for him as a young boy living in Louisiana, how he went overseas to Vietnam as a soldier during the war, to what his life is like being Uncle Si on A&E show Duck Dynasty.

Release

It was first published on September 3, 2013, by Simon & Schuster. They also published an audiobook adaption narrated by Si Robertson. On September 27, 2016, it had a Christian follow-up titled Si-renity: How I Stay Calm and Keep the Faith.

Reception

The book became a New York Times Best Seller, and Publishers Weekly wrote "The Duck Dynasty empire rolls on. Si Robertson, a member of the extravagantly bearded Robertson clan, who struck it rich in the duck call business and then got famous thanks to a reality TV show, is the latest member of the family to hit the bestseller lists." The book was positively received and became recommended reading by Entertainment Weekly and PopSugar.

References

American autobiographies
2013 non-fiction books